David Samuel Whatley (November 10, 1914 – March 13, 1961), nicknamed "Speed" and "Hammer Man", was an American Negro league outfielder in the 1930s and 1940s.

A native of Griffin, Georgia, Whatley made his Negro leagues debut with the Birmingham Black Barons in 1937, leading the Negro American League in batting average with a .428 mark. He played for the Homestead Grays from 1939 to 1942, then served in the United States Army during World War II. He returned to the Grays during their 1944 Negro World Series championship season, but finished the season with the New York Black Yankees. Whatley died in Oakland, California in 1961 at age 46.

References

External links
 and Seamheads

1914 births
1961 deaths
Birmingham Black Barons players
Homestead Grays players
Memphis Red Sox players
New York Black Yankees players
United States Army personnel of World War II
African Americans in World War II
Baseball outfielders
African-American United States Army personnel